Belloliva obeon is a species of sea snail, a marine gastropod mollusc in the family Bellolividae, the olives.

Description

Distribution

References

Bellolividae
Gastropods described in 2007